The ideal telecommunication network has the following characteristics: broadband, multi-media, multi-point, multi-rate and economical implementation for a diversity of services (multi-services). The Broadband Integrated Services Digital Network (B-ISDN) was planned to provide these characteristics. Asynchronous Transfer Mode (ATM) was promoted as a target technology for meeting these requirements.

Communication services 
Personal computing facilitated easy access, manipulation, storage, and exchange of information, and required reliable data transmission. Communicating documents by images and the use of high-resolution graphics terminals provided a more natural and informative mode of human interaction than do voice and data alone. Video teleconferencing enhances group interaction at a distance. High-definition entertainment video improves the quality of pictures, but requires much higher transmission rates.

These new data transmission requirements may require new transmission means other than the present overcrowded radio spectrum. A modern telecommunications network (such as the broadband network) must provide all these different services (multi-services) to the user.

Differences from old telephony
Conventional telephony communication used:
 the voice medium only,
 connected only two telephones per telephone call, and
 used circuits of fixed bit-rates.

Modern services can be:
 Multimedia,
 multi-point, and
 multi-rate.

These aspects are examined individually in the following three sub-sections.

Multi-media 
A multi-media call may communicate audio, data, still images, or full-motion video, or any combination of these media. Each medium has different demands for communication quality, such as:
 bandwidth requirement,
 signal latency within the network, and
 signal fidelity upon delivery by the network.

The information content of each medium may affect the information generated by other media. For example, voice could be transcribed into data via voice recognition, and data commands may control the way voice and video are presented. These interactions most often occur at the communication terminals, but may also occur within the network.

Multi-point 
Traditional voice calls are predominantly two party calls, requiring a point-to-point connection using only the voice medium. To access pictorial information in a remote database would require a point-to-point connection that sends low bit-rate queries to the database and high bit-rate video from the database. Entertainment video applications are largely point-to-multi-point connections, requiring one-way communication of full motion video and audio from the program source to the viewers. Video teleconferencing involves connections among many parties, communicating voice, video, as well as data. Offering future services thus requires flexible management of the connection and media requests of a multi-point, multi-media communication call.

Multi-rate 
A multi-rate service network is one which flexibly allocates transmission capacity to connections. A multi-media network has to support a broad range of bit-rates demanded by connections, not only because there are many communication media, but also because a communication medium may be encoded by algorithms with different bit-rates. For example, audio signals can be encoded with bit-rates ranging from less than 1 kbit/s to hundreds of kbit/s, using different encoding algorithms with a wide range of complexity and quality of audio reproduction. Similarly, full motion video signals may be encoded with bit-rates ranging from less than 1 Mbit/s to hundreds of Mbit/s. Thus a network transporting both video and audio signals may have to integrate traffic with a very broad range of bit-rates.

A single network for multiple services

Traditional networks 
Traditionally, the various services mentioned above were carried via separate networks: voice on the telephone network, data on computer networks such as local area networks, video teleconferencing on private corporate networks, and television on broadcast radio or cable networks and.

These networks were largely engineered for a specific application and are not suited to other applications. For example, the traditional telephone network is too noisy and inefficient for bursty data communication. On the other hand, data networks which store and forward messages using computers had limited connectivity, usually did not have sufficient bandwidth for digitised voice and video signals, and suffer from unacceptable delays for the real-time signals. Television networks using radio or cables were largely broadcast networks with minimum switching facilities.

Benefits of a single network for multiple services 
It was desirable to have a single network for providing all these communication services to achieve the economy of sharing. This economy motivates the general idea of an integrated services network. Integration avoids the need for many overlaying networks, which complicates network management and reduces flexibility in the introduction and evolution of services. This integration was made possible with advances in broadband technologies and high-speed information processing of the 1990s.

Fiber optics for broadband networks and MSO 
While multiple network structures were capable of supporting broadband services, an ever-increasing percentage of broadband and MSO providers opted for fibre-optic network structures to support both present and future bandwidth requirements.

CATV (cable television), HDTV (high definition television), VoIP (voice over internet protocol), and broadband internet are some of the most common applications now being supported by fibre optic networks, in some cases directly to the home (FTTh – Fibre To The Home). These types of fibre optic networks incorporate a wide variety of products to support and distribute the signal from the central office to an optic node, and ultimately to the subscriber (end-user).

Traffic

Types 
Modern networks have to carry integrated traffic consisting of voice, video and data. The Broadband Integrated Services Digital Network (B-ISDN) was designed for these needs. The types of traffic supported by a broadband network can be classified according to three characteristics:

 Bandwidth is the amount of network capacity required to support a connection.
 Latency is the amount of delay associated with a connection. Requesting low latency in the quality of service (QoS) profile means that the cells need to travel quickly from one point in the network to another.
 Cell-delay variation (CDV) is the range of delays experienced by each group of associated cells. Low cell-delay variation means a group of cells must travel through the network without getting too far apart from one another.

Requirements of the types of traffic 
The types of traffic found in a broadband network (with examples) and their respective requirements are summarised in Table 1.

See also 

 Asynchronous Transfer Mode (ATM)
 Teletraffic engineering in broadband networks
 Broadband
 Circuit-switched networks
 Packet-switched networks

References

External links 
User-Centric Broadband Networks Technology White Paper

Broadband